Anne de la Tour d'Auvergne may refer to:

 Anne de la Tour d'Auvergne (d. 1512), daughter of Bertrand VI of Auvergne, wife of the 1st Duke of Albany and then comte de La Chambre
 Anne, Countess of Auvergne (d. 1524), reigning Countess of Auvergne, daughter of John III of Auvergne, wife of the 2nd Duke of Albany